WOIR (1430 AM) is a radio station broadcasting a Spanish-language Christian format licensed to Homestead, Florida, United States, and serving South Florida. The station is currently owned by ERJ Media, LLC, a subsidiary of the El Rey Jesús church in Miami, and programmed by the Iglesia Pentecostal Víspera del Fin.

History

Early years
On May 29, 1957—nearly two years after the filing was made—South Dade Broadcasting Co. was granted a construction permit to build a new radio station to serve Homestead on 1430 kHz, with 500 watts during daytime hours only. The station went on the air November 2 of that year, becoming the first broadcasting outlet in southern Dade County. In 1962, Seven League Productions purchased WSDB; the transaction closed in January 1963, and the call sign was changed to WIII that April. Seven League, however, struggled financially. In 1964, two groups sought the license for themselves: one, another group known as South Dade Broadcasting Company, ended up purchasing Seven League in 1966, beating out Redlands Broadcasting, a group that included a former mayor of Homestead.

In 1972, Clement Littauer purchased control of WIII. Littauer had owned two radio stations in San Juan, Puerto Rico, and had started the only English-language TV station there. The call letters changed to WRSD on June 1 of that year, changing to a middle-of-the-road format. Two years later, WRSD became WQDI when Southland Radio, Inc., acquired it; Southland flipped WQDI to country, the only format it ran at its stations. During Southland ownership, the daytime-only station was approved in 1978 to begin nighttime service, which was activated in 1980.

Southland Radio sold WQDI to Miami physician Ramiro Marrero in 1984 for $1.265 million; the station changed call signs to WRBA on September 15, 1985. However, WRBA's operational existence would prove short-lived. On the evening of August 15, 1986, the station informed its listeners it was going off air to perform construction work at its office; no such construction ever materialized, and the same day, the owners had filed for bankruptcy.

Radio Continental
WRBA was bought out of its silence by the Continental Broadcasting Corporation in 1987 and emerged as a Spanish-language station, WOIR "Radio Continental". The station's primary audience consisted of listeners of Mexican and Central and South American origin. In 1991, Carlos and Angela López reached a deal to buy WOIR, making it the first Miami-area station to be owned by Colombian Americans.

During Hurricane Andrew, Radio Continental was credited with saving the lives of hundreds of farmworkers in a labor camp. General manager Armando Gallegos remained on the air from the afternoon until midnight, pleading for listeners to evacuate; there were no deaths or injuries. The hurricane toppled both of the station's towers; after the storm, the engineer improvised a new antenna using a tree, and with aid from the city of Homestead and the Department of Defense, the station was back on air.

Christian radio
In 1995, Continental Broadcasting sold WOIR to Corpo-Mex, Inc. The format continued, but the presence of religious programming on the frequency, branded as Radio Amanecer, increased, dominating by 1999. In 2001, Amanecer Christian Network, Inc., purchased WOIR from Corpo-Mex for $2.58 million.

Amanecer Christian Network went into receivership in 2008, and a new investment company replaced it as the licensee; one of the two major debtors was Corpo-Mex, which had sold the station to Amanecer Christian Network in 2001.

ERJ Media filed to sell the station for $900,000 to Iglesia Pentecostal Víspera del Fin of Seattle, which airs Spanish-language Christian programming under the name  on stations on the West Coast, in December 2022. The church then assumed programming responsibilities for WOIR on December 16, 2022.

References

External links

OIR
Radio stations established in 1957
OIR
News and talk radio stations in the United States
1957 establishments in Florida